Chris Collingwood (born October 3, 1967) is an American singer, songwriter, and artist. He is best known as the former lead vocalist and founding member of the power pop band Fountains of Wayne.

Early Life and Education
Collingwood was born in Britain and grew up in Sellersville, Pennsylvania. He graduated from The Hill School. He attended Williams College alongside his future Fountains of Wayne bandmate Adam Schlesinger. The two collaborated several times prior to the formation of Fountains of Wayne.

Fountains of Wayne 

In 1995, Collingwood and Schlesinger formed Fountains of Wayne. They recorded one album, titled Fountains of Wayne, before recruiting Jody Porter and Brian Young, a year later in 1997.

Though Collingwood and Schlesinger shared cowriter credit for all original Fountains of Wayne material, for most of their career together, they wrote their songs separately.

The band won a Grammy for their song Stacy's Mom, in 2004. They split up in 2013.

Schlesinger died in 2020 and the surviving band members had an online reunion shortly after.

Influences 
Collingwood's major influences are The Beatles, The Zombies, The Hollies, Aztec Camera, Squeeze, and Blue Öyster Cult.

Discography 

Studio albums

 Fountains of Wayne (1996)
 Utopia Parkway (1999)
 Welcome Interstate Managers (2003)
 Traffic and Weather (2007)
 Sky Full of Holes (2011)

References

External links
 Fountains of Wayne
 Look Park Official website
 Chris Collingwood on Twitter
Look Park Official Facebook

1967 births
20th-century American guitarists
20th-century American male musicians
American rock guitarists
American male guitarists
British emigrants to the United States
British rock guitarists
British male guitarists
Williams College alumni
Living people
Musicians from Pittsburgh
People from Sellersville, Pennsylvania
Writers from Northampton, Massachusetts
Fountains of Wayne members
The Hill School alumni
Guitarists from Pennsylvania
People from Bucks County, Pennsylvania